The 2014 World Snooker Championship (officially the 2014 Dafabet World Snooker Championship) was a professional snooker tournament that took place from 19 April to 5 May 2014 at the Crucible Theatre in Sheffield, England. It was the 38th consecutive year that the World Snooker Championship had been held at the Crucible. The tournament was also the last ranking event of the 2013–14 snooker season. The event was sponsored by Dafabet for the first time. A qualifying tournament was held from 8 to 16 April 2014 at the Ponds Forge International Sports Centre in Sheffield for 16 players, who met 16 seeded participants at the main championships.

Ronnie O'Sullivan was the defending champion, having won the previous year's event by defeating Barry Hawkins in the final. Mark Selby won the 2014 event to capture his first world title by defeating O'Sullivan 18–14 in the final. This was Selby's fourth ranking title, also completing the Triple Crown of World Championship, UK Championship, and Masters titles. Neil Robertson compiled the highest  of the tournament, a 140, and scored his 100th century break of the season in his quarter-final win over Judd Trump. The event featured a prize fund of £1,214,000, the winner receiving £300,000.

Background
The 2014 World Snooker Championship featured 32 professional players competing in one-on-one snooker matches in a single-elimination format, each match played over several . These 32 players for the event were selected through a mix of the snooker world rankings and a pre-tournament qualification round. The first World Snooker Championship took place in 1927, with the final held at Camkin's Hall in Birmingham, England, and the title was won by Joe Davis. Since 1977, the event has been held at the Crucible Theatre in Sheffield, England. , Stephen Hendry and  Ronnie O’Sullivan are the event's most successful participants in the modern era, having both won the championship seven times. The defending champion was Ronnie O'Sullivan, who had won the 2013 event, defeating Barry Hawkins in the final to take his fifth title. The winner of the 2014 championship received £300,000, from a total prize fund of £1,214,000. The event was organised by World Snooker in partnership with the World Professional Billiards and Snooker Association (WPBSA).

Format
The 2014 World Snooker Championship was a professional snooker tournament played from 19 April to 5 May 2014 at the Crucible Theatre in Sheffield, England. This was the 38th consecutive year that the World Snooker Championship was held at the Crucible Theatre. Of the 32 participants, 16 players qualified for the event from the snooker world rankings, and 16 from a four-round qualifying event held at Ponds Forge International Sports Centre in Sheffield, England. The event was the last of twelve ranking events in the 2013–14 snooker season on the World Snooker Tour. The tournament was sponsored by sports betting company Dafabet for the first time, replacing previous sponsors Betfair.

Prize fund
The total prize money for the 2014 World Snooker Championship was £1,214,000, a raise from the previous year's £1,111,000. The winner received £300,000, an increase of £50,000 over the previous year. The breakdown of prize money for the 2014 event is shown below:

Winner: £300,000
Runner-up: £125,000
Semi-final: £55,000
Quarter-final: £25,000
Last 16: £16,000
Last 32: £12,000
Last 48: £8,500
Last 64: £5,000
Last 96: £1,000
Non-televised highest break: £1,000
Televised highest break: £10,000
Total: £1,214,000

Tournament summary

Qualifying

Four former world champions lost in the qualifying rounds. Six-time champion Steve Davis was defeated by Craig Steadman, a match Davis needed to win to retain his place on the World Snooker Tour. Two-time champion Mark Williams lost to Alan McManus in the final qualifying round 8–10 and failed to play at the main championship for the first time since 1996. Graeme Dott lost to Kyren Wilson 7–10, whilst Peter Ebdon lost 8–10 to Robin Hull. The loss for Ebdon meant that he ended 22 consecutive appearances at the event since his debut in 1992. Two previous runners-up also did not qualify. Six-time finalist Jimmy White lost in the second qualifying round to Ian Burns 10–4, whilst two-time runner-up Matthew Stevens lost to Tom Ford.

For the first time, no Welsh player automatically qualified to play at the Crucible. Three Welshmen, Dominic Dale, Michael White, and Ryan Day, won places in the first round through qualification. At the age of 44, 1997 champion Ken Doherty defeated Dechawat Poomjaeng 10–5 in qualifying to become the oldest player to reach the main stage. Kyren Wilson, Michael Wasley, Xiao Guodong, and Robbie Williams all made their debuts in the competition by coming through qualifying.

First round

The first round was played as best-of-19  matches held over two  between 19 and 24 April 2014. Defending champion Ronnie O'Sullivan drew world number 122 Robin Hull in the first round, and won 10–4. The 2010 World Snooker Championship winner Neil Robertson won his first round match against Robbie Williams, leading 7–2 after the first session, and won 10–2. In his victory, he compiled breaks of 102, 102, 103, 132, and the tournament's highest of 140 to take his season total of century breaks to 97. The 2005 champion Shaun Murphy trailed 5–7 behind against Jamie Cope, before the pair played a deciding frame at 9–9. Murphy took the frame 65–49 to win the match. Third seed Mark Selby also won a deciding frame, as he defeated Michael White 10–9.

Fourth seed Ding Junhui had previously won five ranking events in the season, a record he jointly held with Stephen Hendry. In his first round match he was defeated 9–10 by debutant Michael Wasley, and so failed to set a new record for tournament wins in a season. Ken Doherty won the last seven frames of his match against sixth seed Stuart Bingham to win 10–5, recording his first victory at the event since 2006. Alan McManus achieved his first Crucible win since 2005 by defeating fellow Scot John Higgins 10–7, while Dominic Dale won his first Crucible match since 2000 by defeating 13th seed Mark Davis 10–5. The final frame of Ricky Walden's first-round match against Kyren Wilson lasted 73 minutes 13 seconds, just under two minutes short of the Crucible record of 74 minutes 58 seconds that Stephen Maguire and Mark King set in 2009. Walden won the frame to clinch a 10–7 victory. Qualifier Ryan Day defeated tenth seed Stephen Maguire 10–9.

During the first round, a "Ladies' Day" at the tournament featured events designed to encourage greater female participation in the sport. The day was also used to raise money for the Bluebell Wood Children's Hospice in Rotherham.

Second round

The second round was played as best-of-25 frame matches over three sessions between 25 and 28 April 2014. O'Sullivan trailed Joe Perry throughout the first two sessions of their match, but ultimately won 13–11. O'Sullivan described the encounter with Perry as "probably my most exciting match ever at the Crucible." McManus played Doherty and won six frames in a row from 4–3 ahead to lead 10–3, and later won 13–8. This was McManus' first quarter-final appearance since 2005, when he also beat Doherty in the second round. Murphy led Marco Fu 9–7 after the first two sessions, before winning four of the next five frames to win 13–8.

Dale defeated Wasley 13–4 to reach his first World Championship quarter-final since 2000. In defeating Mark Allen 13–7, Robertson added two more century breaks to bring his season total to 99. In the last two frames he made breaks of 94 and 92, narrowly missing his 100th century of the season. Barry Hawkins met Walden in a repeat of the previous year's semi-final. Hawkins won again, this time 13–11, to reach his second Crucible quarter-final. Selby led Ali Carter 9–7 after the first two sessions, and won three frames in a row to lead 12–7. Carter won the next two frames before Selby won the 20th frame by 82 points to 19 to win 13–9. In the last second round match, seventh seed Judd Trump defeated Day 13–7.

Quarter-finals

The quarter-finals were played as best-of-25 frame matches across three sessions between 29 and 30 April. Selby and McManus only completed seven of the scheduled eight frames in the first session of their match as they ran out of time, with Selby leading 4–3. Selby won eight of the nine in the second session to lead 12–4, and won the second frame of the final session to win 13–5.

Hawkins opened up a 6–2 lead over Dominic Dale in the first session, and extended his lead to 11–5 after two sessions. In the final session, Dale fought back to win seven frames in a row and take the lead 12–11, but Hawkins captured the last two frames to win the match 13–12. Neil Robertson trailed Judd Trump 2–6 after the first session, and 6–9 after the second, before he won seven of the last nine frames to win the match 13–11. In the 22nd frame, Robertson compiled his 100th century break of the 2013–14 snooker season.

Semi-finals

The semi-finals were played as best-of-33 frame matches over four sessions on 2 and 3 May. O'Sullivan and Hawkins contested the first semi-final, a rematch of the previous year's final. O'Sullivan led at 10–2, but Hawkins won three of the next four to trail overnight 11–5. O'Sullivan made breaks of 76, 55, 103 and 84 and later won the match 17–7 in the final frame of the third session. This was the first time in ten years that a player had won two matches with a session to spare in the same event, having done so himself previously in 2004. That year, O'Sullivan won the championship one frame into the final session.

In the second semi-final, a match that lasted 12 hours and 4 minutes, Selby defeated Robertson 17–15 to reach his second World Championship final. Selby had previously reached the final once before in 2007. During the match, Robertson extended his century break record to 103, but his defeat meant that he lost his world number one position.

Final

The final was played on the 4 and 5 May 2014 between Ronnie O'Sullivan and Mark Selby as best-of-35 frames, held over four sessions and was refereed by Brendan Moore. This was the first time that Moore had presided over a World Championship final. In the first session on Sunday afternoon, O'Sullivan took a 5–3 lead, which he extended in the evening session to 8–3 and 10–5. Selby took the last two frames of the day to leave O'Sullivan with a 10–7 overnight lead. O'Sullivan's highest break on the first day was a 131 in the 14th frame, while Selby's highest break of the day was just 62.

The third session concluded after just six of the scheduled eight frames. Selby won five of the six frames to go into the final session with a 12–11 lead. He then won three of the first four frames of the evening session, extending his lead to 15–12 at the mid-session interval, before winning the final 18–14 to capture his first world title. In all, Selby won 13 of the last 17 frames, and scored his two highest breaks of the match in frames 30 and 31 to increase his lead from 15–14 to 17–14. This was Selby's fourth ranking title, and made him the ninth player to win all three Triple Crown events, reinstating him as the world number one.

O'Sullivan said "I want to congratulate Mark on a fantastic tournament. He's been the best player over 17 days... In the end I was numb as he was too strong and tough." Selby dedicated the title to his late father, who died two months before he turned professional.

Main draw
The draw for the first round took place on 17 April 2014, one day after the qualifying, and was broadcast live on World Snooker's YouTube channel at 12 pm BST. The numbers in parentheses beside some of the players are their seeding ranks, whilst players in bold denote match winners. Below are the full results from the event.

Qualifying
The qualifying rounds 1–3 for the tournament took place between 8 and 13 April 2014 at the Ponds Forge International Sports Centre in Sheffield, England. The final round of qualifying took place on 15 and 16 April 2014 at the same venue. This was the first snooker event held at the venue.

Century breaks

Televised stage centuries 
There were 58 century breaks in the televised stage of the World Championship. For every century break made during the main tournament, Dafabet, donated £100 to the Bluebell Wood Children's Hospice. Neil Robertson made the highest break of the event, a 140.

 140, 137, 132, 130, 113, 108, 103, 102, 101, 100  Neil Robertson
 137, 112, 109  Ricky Walden
 136, 131, 124, 124, 118, 117, 113, 112, 108, 106, 103, 102, 100  Ronnie O'Sullivan
 136, 124, 116, 109  Marco Fu
 136  Ding Junhui
 135, 108, 103  Michael Wasley
 134, 115, 106, 104  Barry Hawkins
 134  Stephen Maguire
 133, 127, 110, 109, 104  Mark Selby
 130, 107  Ryan Day
 117, 107  Judd Trump
 112, 102, 101  Shaun Murphy
 111  Jamie Burnett
 111  John Higgins
 110, 102  Ali Carter
 107  Alan McManus
 106  Dominic Dale
 102  Robin Hull

Qualifying stage centuries 
There were 69 century breaks in the qualifying stage of the World Championship. The highest was 139 by both Martin O'Donnell and Andrew Higginson.

 139, 119, 100  Martin O'Donnell
 139  Andrew Higginson
 137, 134, 132, 114, 113, 106  Martin Gould
 135  Fergal O'Brien
 134  Kurt Maflin
 133, 107, 102  Robin Hull
 133  Chen Zhe
 132, 131, 121  Ian Burns
 132, 100  Sam Baird
 130  Alan McManus
 128, 121, 117  Thanawat Thirapongpaiboon
 127  Liu Chuang
 125, 103  Jamie Cope
 123  Ross Muir
 122  Craig Steadman
 122  Michael Wasley
 120, 116, 104  Li Hang
 119, 114  Kyren Wilson
 119  Xiao Guodong
 118  Luca Brecel
 118  David Morris
 117, 102, 102  Cao Xinlong
 117  Alexander Ursenbacher
 116, 107  Sanderson Lam
 113  Stuart Carrington
 112  Li Yan
 111, 104  Matthew Selt
 111, 101  Tom Ford
 111  Chris Norbury
 111  Zhang Anda
 111  Igor Figueiredo
 110  Alex Borg
 110  Robbie Williams
 109  Noppon Saengkham
 108, 101  Jamie Jones
 108  Yu Delu
 106  James Cahill
 106  Ryan Day
 105  Jimmy Robertson
 103  Liang Wenbo
 102  Rod Lawler
 101  Alfie Burden
 101  Mark Joyce
 100  Ken Doherty
 100  Michael White

References

2014
World Championship
2014 in English sport
Sports competitions in Sheffield
April 2014 sports events in the United Kingdom
May 2014 sports events in the United Kingdom